The Veterans of Foreign Wars Memorial Plaza is a plaza in Vancouver, Washington, United States. The plaza was created in 2013, and continues to be maintained by Veterans of Foreign Wars, Post 7824. It features a "Remembrance Wall" with murals by the Clark County Mural Society.

References

2013 establishments in Washington (state)
Geography of Vancouver, Washington
Monuments and memorials in Vancouver, Washington
Squares in the United States